Oleg Yurievich Lipchenko (born 13 July 1957) is a Canadian artist and illustrator. He is a  member of CANSCAIP.

He was born in Ukraine and moved to Toronto, Ontario in 1999. He studied Art at Art School in Poltava, Ukraine. He studied Art and Architecture at Poltava Technical University, gaining a Master of Architecture degree. Oleg Lipchenko currently lives in Toronto, Ontario.

Awards
Oleg Lipchenko won the 2009 Elizabeth Mrazik-Cleaver Canadian Picture Book Award for his illustrations to the  edition of Alice's Adventures in Wonderland, published by Studio Treasure and Tundra Books.

References

External links
 

1957 births
Living people
Modern artists
Artists from Toronto
20th-century Canadian painters
Canadian male painters
21st-century Canadian painters
Canadian illustrators
Canadian children's book illustrators
Ukrainian artists
Ukrainian architects
Ukrainian emigrants to Canada
20th-century Canadian male artists
21st-century Canadian male artists